St Albans station may refer to:

St Albans City railway station, in St Albans, Hertfordshire, England
St Albans Abbey railway station, in St Albans, Hertfordshire, England
St Albans railway station (Hatfield and St Albans Railway), a former station in St Albans, Hertfordshire, England
 St Albans railway station, Melbourne, Victoria, Australia
 St. Albans station (LIRR), Queens, New York City, USA
 St. Albans station (Vermont), St. Albans, Vermont, USA
 Saint Albans Air Force Station, Vermont